The 2019 Mid Ulster District Council election took place on 2 May 2019 to elect members of Mid Ulster District Council in Northern Ireland. This was on the same day as other local elections.

Election results

Note: "Votes" are the first preference votes.

The overall turnout was 58.97% with a total of 59,108 valid votes cast. A total of 1,072 ballots were rejected.

Districts summary

|- class="unsortable" align="centre"
!rowspan=2 align="left"|Ward
! % 
!Cllrs
! %
!Cllrs
! %
!Cllrs
! %
!Cllrs
! %
!Cllrs
! % 
!Cllrs
!rowspan=2|TotalCllrs
|- class="unsortable" align="center"
!colspan=2 bgcolor="" | Sinn Féin
!colspan=2 bgcolor="" | DUP
!colspan=2 bgcolor=""| SDLP
!colspan=2 bgcolor="" | UUP
!colspan=2 bgcolor="" | Alliance
!colspan=2 bgcolor="white"| Others
|-
|align="left"|Carntogher
|bgcolor="#008800"|54.4
|bgcolor="#008800"|3
|15.5
|1
|13.5
|1
|7.0
|0
|0.0
|0
|9.7
|0
|5
|-
|align="left"|Clogher Valley
|31.3
|2
|bgcolor="#D46A4C"|32.7
|bgcolor="#D46A4C"|2
|18.0
|1
|18.0
|1
|0.0
|0
|0.0
|0
|6
|-
|align="left"|Cookstown
|bgcolor="#008800"|42.4
|bgcolor="#008800"|3
|20.8
|1
|14.5
|1
|19.8
|2
|0.0
|0
|2.5
|0
|7
|-
|align="left"|Dungannon
|20.7
|1
|bgcolor="#D46A4C"|31.8
|bgcolor="#D46A4C"|2
|8.6
|1
|12.6
|1
|5.2
|0
|21.2
|1
|6
|-
|align="left"|Magherafelt
|bgcolor="#008800"|36.0
|bgcolor="#008800"|2
|32.0
|2
|16.0
|1
|13.2
|0
|0.0
|0
|2.8
|0
|5
|-
|align="left"|Moyola
|bgcolor="#008800"|50.9
|bgcolor="#008800"|3
|20.6
|1
|11.7
|0
|11.9
|1
|3.8
|0
|1.2
|0
|5
|-
|align="left"|Torrent
|bgcolor="#008800"|44.2
|bgcolor="#008800"|3
|9.9
|0
|17.9
|1
|11.2
|1
|0.0
|0
|16.8
|1
|6
|-
|- class="unsortable" class="sortbottom" style="background:#C9C9C9"
|align="left"| Total
|39.8
|17
|23.2
|9
|14.4
|6
|13.6
|6
|1.2
|0
|7.8
|2
|40
|-
|}

District results

Carntogher 

2014: 3 x Sinn Féin, 1 x DUP, 1 x SDLP
2019: 3 x Sinn Féin, 1 x DUP, 1 x SDLP
2014–2019 Change: No change

Clogher Valley 

2014: 2 x DUP, 2 x Sinn Féin, 1 x UUP, 1 x SDLP
2019: 2 x DUP, 2 x Sinn Féin, 1 x UUP, 1 x SDLP
2014–2019 Change: No change

Cookstown 

2014: 3 x Sinn Féin, 2 x UUP, 1 x DUP, 1 x SDLP
2019: 3 x Sinn Féin, 2 x UUP, 1 x DUP, 1 x SDLP
2014–2019 Change: No change

Dungannon 

2014: 2 x DUP, 1 x Sinn Féin, 1 x UUP, 1 x SDLP, 1 x Independent
2019: 2 x DUP, 1 x Sinn Féin, 1 x UUP, 1 x SDLP, 1 x Independent
2014–2019 Change: No change

Magherafelt 

2014: 2 x Sinn Féin, 1 x DUP, 1 x SDLP, 1 x UUP
2019: 2 x Sinn Féin, 2 x DUP, 1 x SDLP
2014–2019 Change: DUP gain from UUP

Moyola 

2014: 3 x Sinn Féin, 1 x DUP, 1 x UUP
2019: 3 x Sinn Féin, 1 x DUP, 1 x UUP
2014–2019 Change: No change

Torrent 

2014: 4 x Sinn Féin, 1 x SDLP, 1 x UUP
2019: 3 x Sinn Féin, 1 x SDLP, 1 x UUP, 1 x Independent
2014–2019 Change: Independent gain from Sinn Féin

Changes during the term

† Co-options

‡ Changes in affiliation

– Suspensions
None

Last updated 7 January 2023.

Current composition: see Mid Ulster District Council

References 

2019 Northern Ireland local elections
21st century in County Londonderry
21st century in County Tyrone
Elections in County Londonderry
Elections in County Tyrone